The Usinskoe mine is a mine located in the south of Russia in Kemerovo Oblast. Usinskoe represents one of the largest manganese reserve in Russia having estimated reserves of 276.5 million tonnes of manganese ore grading 19.1% manganese metal.

References 

Manganese mines in Russia